Nicolas Vichiatto da Silva (born 24 February 1997), simply known as Nicolas, is a Brazilian professional footballer who plays as a left back for América Mineiro.

Club career
Born in Arapongas, Paraná, Nicolas Vicchiato joined Atlético Paranaense's youth setup in 2012, aged 13. He was definitely promoted to the first team in May 2016, after impressing with the under-20 squad.

Nicolas Vicchiato made his Série A debut on 22 June 2016, starting in a 0–0 away draw against Chapecoense; the game was only finished a day later due to the fog on the stadium.

In July 2018 Nicolas Vicchiato joined Ponte Preta on loan until the end of December.

In February 2019 Nicolas Vicchiato joined Atlético Goianiense on a year-long loan.

Honours
Atlético Goianiense
Campeonato Goiano: 2020

Grêmio
Campeonato Gaúcho: 2022
Recopa Gaúcha: 2022

References

External links

1997 births
Living people
People from Arapongas
Brazilian footballers
Association football defenders
Campeonato Brasileiro Série A players
Campeonato Brasileiro Série B players
Club Athletico Paranaense players
Associação Atlética Ponte Preta players
Atlético Clube Goianiense players
Grêmio Foot-Ball Porto Alegrense players
Sportspeople from Paraná (state)
América Futebol Clube (MG) players